Lau, also known as Mala, is an Oceanic language spoken on northeast Malaita, in the Solomon Islands. In 1999, Lau had about 16,937 first-language speakers, with many second-language speakers through Malaitan communities in the Solomon Islands, especially in Honiara.

The language

Phonology 
Lau distinguishes voiced and voiceless stops and has a separate series of labial-velar phonemes distinct from the regular velars. The complete consonant inventory is presented in the table below (with orthographical conventions in angled brackets). The /r/ is a trilled apical rhotic.

The vowel inventory of five items is presented in the table below (again with orthographical conventions in angled brackets). These vowels can be long or short depending on the word. Long vowels are orthographically represented by doubling the vowel. The phonotactics do not allow closed syllables, i.e. every word ends with a vowel.

Morphology 
Nouns describe people, places, or things. Nouns can be suffixed by possessive markers. For example, lima 'hand' can be suffixed by the first person singular possessive marker -gu to form limgagu 'my hand'. The same suffix can be used on position phrases such as in burigu 'behind me', where buri means 'behind'. Nouns are split into independent nouns and verbal nouns. Na is the only independent noun that is used in the Lau language. It is only added to nouns when one is expressing relationships, or it is added to cardinal numbers to form an ordinal number.

Pronouns are words that replace a noun in a sentence and can function by themselves as a noun phrase. In Lau, pronouns may suffixed to nouns to denote possession, and suffixed to a verb to mark the subject. Pronouns may only be attached to a certain class of nouns, namely anything that is in close relationship to the person who takes, occupies or holds something without necessarily having ownership. When a pronoun is suffixed to a verb, a second object appears in the suffixed pronoun singular and plural third. Lastly, when a pronoun is used as the subject of a verb such as i, there are multiple ways you can use it. One way is when the suffixed pronoun cannot be added to a word, the longer forms of i are used as possessive pronouns. Shorter forms of i are always used with the forms of i because they cannot be used by themselves as the subject.

Verbs are words that describe an action, state or occurrence of something. In Lau, any word can be suffixed by verbal particles and thus used as a verb. In other words, they can be joined to governing pronouns of first persons singular and second persons singular. These verbal particles are ka and ko. Ka can be used at the same time when someone is talking about something in the present and in the future tense. On the other hand, ko can be used when someone is talking in the present and future tense but it cannot be used at the same time. Moreover, ko is used only with personal pronouns.

Adverbs are words or phrases that modify an adjective, verb or another adverb. Most adverbs that are use in the Lau language are just nouns and verbs and occasionally some adjectives. Adverbs are used when someone is talking about a place, a time, and manner.

Adjectives are words or phrases denoting an attribute. Lau uses verbs for attributes, but some adjectives appear without the verbal particles. Adjectival prefixes that are prefixed to verbs includes a-, ma-, tata-, and m-. The a- is prefixed to verbs to form participles, as in luga 'to lose'; ma- denotes condition, e.g. lingi 'to pour'.

Lau has two types of prepositions: the verb-like and the noun-like. Verb-like prepositions use the same object morphology as in verbs. The verb-like prepositions index their complements with object suffixes, which are otherwise used to index objects on verbs. By contrast, the noun-like prepositions index their complements with personal suffixes, which are otherwise used to index possessors on inalienably possessed nouns.

Numerals are prefixed by e-. However, this initial e- is dropped in quick counting, except in the numeral eta. Lau uses the base ten. Single digits are connected to the preceding multiple of ten with the conjunction mana, as in aqala mana fai 'fourteen'. This conjunction is not used after multiples of hundred, as can be seen in tangalau fai aqala mana fai 'one hundred and forty four'.

Syntax 
The Lau clause is divided into five different fields, which are, in order: left periphery > subject field > verbal complex > object field > right periphery. In the example below, ioli gi 'people' is a noun phrase located in the subject field. gera is a co-indexed subject pronoun followed by a marker ka. rii 'shout' is an intransitive verb located in the verbal complex.

Sample Text

God Save the King, from an Anglican translation published in 1945.

God, ka faamouria a King!
Nia ka aofia diena
Usia tooa gi;
Fasuia firua,
Falea mai unidiena,
Faadiena na taloa nia,
God, faamouria a King!

Notes and references

Notes

Bibliography

 
 Na tala ʼuria na idulaa diana, reading primer, 1981.
 Tala ʼaelana idulaa, reading primer, 1982.

External links
 Na Book Fooalaa. Portions of the Book of Common Prayer published by the Melanesian Mission Press, 1945, digitized by Richard Mammana
 Paradisec has a number of collections that include Lau materials, notable is Anna Margetts's (AM4) collection of Lau recordings

Malaita languages
Languages of the Solomon Islands